Anabel Medina Garrigues and Arantxa Sánchez Vicario were the defending champions, but none competed this year.

Giulia Casoni and Mariya Koryttseva won the title by defeating Klaudia Jans and Alicja Rosolska 4–6, 6–3, 7–5 in the final.

Seeds

Draw

Draw

References
 ITF tournament profile

Internazionali Femminili di Palermo - Doubles
2005 Doubles